Salaheddine Hissou (born January 16, 1972) is a long-distance runner from Morocco, who won the gold medal over 5000 metres at the 1999 World Championships in Athletics in Seville. With 26:38.08 he also set a world record over 10,000 metres in Brussels in 1996 and won a bronze medal over 10,000 m at the 1996 Summer Olympics in Atlanta.

Hissou was born in Ait Taghia, Kasba Tadla.

External links

References

1972 births
Living people
Moroccan male long-distance runners
Athletes (track and field) at the 1996 Summer Olympics
Olympic athletes of Morocco
Olympic bronze medalists for Morocco

People from Kasba Tadla
World Athletics Championships medalists
Medalists at the 1996 Summer Olympics
Olympic bronze medalists in athletics (track and field)
World Athletics Championships winners
20th-century Moroccan people
21st-century Moroccan people